The Gun Runner is a 1928 American silent adventure film directed by Edgar Lewis and starring Ricardo Cortez, Nora Lane and Gino Corrado. The film was based on the 1909 novel of the same title by Arthur Stringer. It was made and released by Tiffany Pictures during John M. Stahl's period as head of production for the studio.

Synopsis
In a troubled republic in Central America Julio is ordered by the president to track down a notorious gunrunner in the hills by the frontier. While there he falls in love with Inez, an innkeeper, before discovering that she the brother of Garcia the man he is trying to capture.

Cast
 Ricardo Cortez as Julio
 Nora Lane as Inez
 Gino Corrado as Garcia
 John St. Polis as	The Presidente

References

Bibliography
 Munden, Kenneth White. The American Film Institute Catalog of Motion Pictures Produced in the United States, Part 1. University of California Press, 1997.

External links
 

1928 films
1928 adventure films
1920s English-language films
American silent feature films
American adventure films
American black-and-white films
Films directed by Edgar Lewis
Tiffany Pictures films
Films based on Canadian novels
1920s American films
Silent adventure films